Joshua Plante is an American politician from Maine. Plante, a Democrat, represented District 145 in the Maine House of Representatives, which included Berwick and neighboring Lebanon. He earned a B.S. in Communications & Political Science from the University of New Hampshire in 2010. He is a lifelong resident of Berwick.

Plante served on the Criminal Justice and Public Safety Committee, and was appointed to serve on the State Council for Juvenile Supervision.

References

Year of birth missing (living people)
Living people
People from Berwick, Maine
Democratic Party members of the Maine House of Representatives
University of New Hampshire alumni